Melongena bispinosa is a species of sea snail, a marine gastropod mollusk in the family Melongenidae, the crown conches and their allies.

Description

Distribution

References

Melongenidae
Gastropods described in 1844